Stade du Fort Carré is a multi-use stadium in Antibes, France, home ground of the FC Antibes, named after the neighboring Fort Carré. It is currently used mostly for football matches and the local athletics club.

The stadium is able to hold 7,000 people. 

During the 1938 World Cup, it hosted one game, between Sweden and Cuba.

Fort Carre
Athletics (track and field) venues in France
Buildings and structures in Antibes
1938 FIFA World Cup stadiums
Sports venues in Alpes-Maritimes